Jean-Baptiste Michonis (1735 – 17 June 1794) was a personality of the French Revolution.  Originally a producer of lemonade, he became a member of the Commune de Paris, inspector of prisons and chief of police.  He participated in the "complot de l'œillet", a failed attempt to rescue Marie-Antoinette organised by Jean, Baron de Batz, and for this was guillotined in what is now the Place de la Nation.  He was buried in the cimetière de Picpus.

References

1735 births
1794 deaths
French people executed by guillotine during the French Revolution